Panamesine (developmental code name EMD-57455) is a sigma receptor antagonist that was under development by Merck as a potential antipsychotic for the treatment of schizophrenia in the 1990s but was never marketed. It is a selective antagonist of both sigma receptor subtypes, the σ1 and σ2 receptors (IC50 = 6 nM). In addition, the major metabolite of the drug, EMD-59983, has high affinity for the sigma receptors (IC50 = 24 nM) and the dopamine D2 (IC50 = 23 nM) and D3 receptors, with potent antidopaminergic activity. Panamesine reached phase II clinical trials for schizophrenia prior to the discontinuation of its development.

See also
 BMY-14802
 Eliprodil
 Rimcazole

References

Abandoned drugs
Tertiary alcohols
Antipsychotics
Benzodioxoles
D2 antagonists
D3 antagonists
Ketones
Oxazolidines
4-Phenylpiperidines
Sigma antagonists